Bing Concert Hall is a performing arts facility at Stanford University that opened in January  2013. The heart of the building is the oval-shaped concert hall, which has 842 seats arranged in a vineyard style surrounding the stage in terraces. All the seats are within 75 feet of the conductor, and the seats in the center section begin at the stage level.  On the north side of the central concert hall is the smaller Bing Studio, which can be configured to accommodate a variety of performance types, e.g., cabaret, club, and theater.

The hall is named after Peter and Helen Bing, notable donors to Stanford who donated the lead gift of $50 million towards its construction Eventual construction cost was $111.9 million.

Bing Concert Hall was designed by Richard Olcott of Ennead Architects, with the acoustics done by Yasuhisa Toyota of Nagata Acoustics, who also worked on Walt Disney Concert Hall in Los Angeles, California and New World Symphony in Miami Beach, Florida.

References

Stanford University places
Music venues in the San Francisco Bay Area